The PBA on ABC (later renamed as The PBA on TV5) was a branding for presentation of Philippine Basketball Association games by the Associated Broadcasting Company. The PBA on ABC premiered on February 22, 2004, replacing the previous broadcaster of the games, National Broadcasting Network and Intercontinental Broadcasting Corporation (PBA on NBN/IBC).

History
Due to poor performance and disappointing ratings, the PBA disbanded a broadcasting consortium between the National Broadcasting Network and the Intercontinental Broadcasting Corporation after the 2003 season, and took bids on a new broadcast contract for the league. In January 2004, the PBA began a contract with the Associated Broadcasting Company to broadcast PBA games for one year, beating bids from Solar Sports and a group led by former Vintage Television owner Bobong Velez. The new ABC operation picked up talent from the former NBN/IBC coverage, including Mico Halili, Quinito Henson, Paolo Trillo and Norman Black. Ed Picson was also hired by ABC, after a two-year hiatus from covering the PBA due to a fallout between him and Viva TV in 2002.

After the 2004-05 PBA Philippine Cup, the league and the network extended the contract for the 2005 Fiesta Conference. After the contract expired in 2005, despite a low amount of money offered, the league chose ABC over Solar Sports, who had a much bigger bid than the former. ABC and the PBA then signed a three-year deal that expired after the 2007-08 season.

Citing financial constraints, ABC backed out of bidding for a new contract for the 2008-09 season's PBA coverage. Solar Sports, through local network Radio Philippines Network (RPN), would the new broadcast partner of the PBA for the following season.

Even though the network would be dropping the PBA, ABC still rebranded their PBA coverage during their August 2008 relaunch as TV5 in the middle of the 2008 PBA Fiesta Conference Finals (which would also be the final games shown by the network). The final PBA game shown on ABC/TV5 was Game 7 of the Fiesta Conference finals between the Air21 Express and Barangay Ginebra Kings on August 20, 2008. Mico Halili and Jason Webb were the commentators for its last run.

Commentators

Play-by-play

Charlie Cuna
Mico Halili
Mon Liboro
Ed Picson
Benjie Santiago (2004 PBA Fiesta Conference-Present)
Boyet Sison
Hans Montenegro

Color
Norman Black (2004 PBA Fiesta Conference to 2007-08 PBA Philippine Cup)
Paolo Trillo (2004 PBA Fiesta Conference)
Rado Dimalibot
Quinito Henson
Peter Martin
Barry Pascua
Leo Isaac
Chot Reyes
Joey SantaMaria
Dominic Uy
TJ Manotoc (2004 PBA Fiesta Conference)
Jason Webb

Courtside reporters
Peaches Aberin
Patricia Bermudez-Hizon
Stephanie Cueva
Joy Delorey
Miakka Lim
Magoo Marjon
Niña Sison
Marga Vargas
Richard del Rosario (2004-05 PBA Philippine Cup to 2008 PBA Fiesta Conference)
Eric Reyes (2004-05 PBA Philippine Cup to 2008 PBA Fiesta Conference)
Dominic Uy
Rheena Villamor

Previous Play-by-Play
Jude Turcuato (2004 PBA Fiesta Conference & 2004-05 PBA Philippine Cup)
Vitto Lazatin (2004 PBA Fiesta Conference)
Hans Montenegro (2004 PBA Fiesta Conference)

Previous Courtside Reporters
George Rocha (2004 PBA Fiesta Conference)
Jannelle So (2004 PBA Fiesta Conference)
Mark Zambrano (2004-05 PBA Philippine Cup)
Pia Boren (2004-05 PBA Philippine Cup)

See also
Philippine Basketball Association
ABC/TV5
iPBA
PBA on ESPN 5
List of programs aired by TV5 (Philippine TV network)

2004 Philippine television series debuts
2008 Philippine television series endings
TV5 (Philippine TV network) original programming
ABC TV5
Philippine sports television series